Events from the year 1717 in Canada.

Incumbents
French Monarch: Louis XV
British and Irish Monarch: George I

Governors
Governor General of New France: Philippe de Rigaud Vaudreuil
Colonial Governor of Louisiana: Jean-Michel de Lepinay
Governor of Nova Scotia: Thomas Caulfeild then Samuel Vetch then Richard Philipps then John Doucett
Governor of Placentia: Samuel Gledhill

Events
 Fort Kaministiquia was founded by French merchants to be the first in a series of forts reaching westward to expand trade and seek a route to the western sea. (Daniel Greysolon Dulhut had built a fort, (Fort Caministigoyan), at the same location on the Kaministiquia River in 1679.)
  Fort Prince of Wales founded by the Hudson's Bay Company, (rebuilt later in stone in 1731.)

Births
 January 29 - Jeffrey Amherst, 1st Baron Amherst, army officer (died 1797)
 November 9 - Louis-Joseph Gaultier de La Vérendrye, French Canadian fur trader and explorer (died 1761).

Deaths
 Pierre Boucher, explorer (born 1622)

References 

 
Canada
Years of the 18th century in Canada